The Couper Institute Library is a public library situated in Cathcart, Glasgow, Scotland. The Couper Institute was originally built by architects Campbell Douglas and James Sellars. The library was added in 1923 by architect John Alfred Taylor Houston on the bequest of Robert Couper. The institute and its library are now are now listed buildings, category B.

History 
The library was built in 1923-24 by J A T Houston as part of building extensions to the northern side of the existing Couper Institute (built 1887) which were delayed by the First World War. The library was designed in an English Baroque style, while the earlier hall presents the Scots Renaissance tradition.

Local paper mill owner Robert Couper left 'about £8000' for a library, reading room and hall to be built on the site.

The building was listed as category B by Historic Environment Scotland in 1970.

See also 
 List of libraries in Scotland

References 

Public libraries in Scotland
Category B listed buildings in Glasgow
Listed library buildings in Scotland
Libraries in Glasgow
1923 establishments in Scotland
Library buildings completed in 1923
Libraries established in 1924
Buildings and structures completed in 1887
1887 establishments in Scotland
Community centres in the United Kingdom